Robert Thornton Young MM (18 February 1894 – 8 September 1960) was an English professional footballer and manager. After a Football League career as a left back with Sunderland that was interrupted by the First World War, he managed Norwich City in two spells and is a member of the club's Hall of Fame.

Personal life 
Young was married with two children. He served as a sergeant in the Durham Light Infantry during the First World War and was awarded the Military Medal in December 1916. After retiring from football management, he became a publican.

Career statistics

Player

Manager

Honours 
Sunderland

 Durham Challenge Cup: 1922–23

Individual

 Norwich City Hall of Fame

References

External links 

 

1894 births
1960 deaths
Footballers from County Durham
English footballers
English football managers
Sunderland A.F.C. players
Norwich City F.C. managers
Recipients of the Military Medal
Association football fullbacks
English Football League players
English Football League managers
Durham Light Infantry soldiers
British Army personnel of World War I
British publicans
People from Brandon, County Durham
20th-century British businesspeople